Mohlsdorf is a village and a former municipality in the district of Greiz, in Thuringia, Germany. Since 1 January 2012, it is part of the municipality Mohlsdorf-Teichwolframsdorf.

See also

References

Former municipalities in Thuringia